The Roman Catholic Diocese of Osasco is a diocese located in the city of Osasco in the Ecclesiastical province of São Paulo in Brazil.

History
 15 March 1989: Established as Diocese of Osasco from the Metropolitan Archdiocese of São Paulo

Leadership
 Bishops of Osasco (Roman rite)
 Bishop Ercílio Turco (2002.04.24 – 2014)
 Bishop Francisco Manuel Vieira (1989.03.15 – 2002.04.24)

References
 GCatholic.org
 Catholic Hierarchy
 Diocese website (Portuguese)

Roman Catholic dioceses in Brazil
Christian organizations established in 1989
Osasco, Roman Catholic Diocese of
Roman Catholic dioceses and prelatures established in the 20th century